Aleksander Berkolds (born 27 April 1996) is an American soccer player who currently plays as a defender.

Career

Tacoma Defiance
Berkolds was selected by the Seattle Sounders in the third round of the 2019 MLS SuperDraft, but would not sign a professional contract with the team. In March, he signed with the club's USL Championship affiliate, the Tacoma Defiance, with Seattle still maintaining his MLS rights. He made his professional debut on March 23, 2019 in a 4–0 defeat to FC Tulsa.

References

External links
Profile at SDSU Athletics

1999 births
Living people
San Diego State Aztecs men's soccer players
Seattle Sounders FC U-23 players
Tacoma Defiance players
Reno 1868 FC players
USL League Two players
USL Championship players
American soccer players
Association football defenders
Soccer players from Los Angeles
People from Northridge, Los Angeles
Seattle Sounders FC draft picks